Le Cri de Paris was an illustrated French political magazine that was founded by Alexandre Natanson in 1897 and was at the beginning a supplement of La Revue Blanche.

Le Cri de Paris title means The Paris Protest in English, but it has in French two other meanings like Paris Fashion (as in « le dernier cri », chic, etc.) and cri as in cris de Paris, i.e. the street cries. This ambiguous title was forged by Félix Fénéon.

The magazine covered news, political articles and satire.  Juan Gris was one of its illustrators. It featured pro-Dreyfus and anti-colonialist drawings by Hermann Paul and Ibels. The magazine was subject to frequent censorship. Le Cri de Paris ceased publication in 1940.

References

1897 establishments in France
1940 disestablishments in France
Censorship in France
Defunct political magazines published in France
French-language magazines
News magazines published in France
French political satire
Satirical magazines published in France
Magazines established in 1897
Magazines disestablished in 1940
Magazines published in Paris